November 15 - Eastern Orthodox liturgical calendar - November 17

All fixed commemorations below are observed on November 29 by Orthodox Churches on the Old Calendar.

For November 16, Orthodox Churches on the Old Calendar commemorate the Saints listed on November 3.

Saints

 Holy Apostle and Evangelist Matthew (60)
 Saint Fulvianus (in holy baptism Matthew), prince of Ethiopia, (1st century)
 Virgin-martyr Ephigenia of Ethiopia (Iphigenia of Ethiopia) (1st century).
 Hieromartyr Hypatius of Gangra, Bishop of Gangra, Wonderworker (326) (see also: March 31)

Pre-Schism Western saints

 Saint Fidentius Armenus, an early saint in Padua in Italy (2nd century)
 Martyrs Elpidius, Marcellus, Eustochius and Companions (362)  (see also: November 15)
 Saint Eucherius of Lyons (449)
 Saints Rufinus, Mark, Valerius and Companions, martyrs in North Africa.
 Saint Afan, a bishop who gave his name to the church of Llanafan in Powys in Wales (6th century)
 Saint Africus, Bishop of Comminges in France, celebrated for his zeal for Orthodoxy (7th century)
 Saint Gobrain, a monk who became Bishop of Vannes in Brittany and at the age of eighty-seven went to live as a hermit (725)
 Saint Otmar, abbot and monastic founder in Switzerland (759)
 Saint Lubuinus, missionary to Friesland (773)
 Saint Ælfric of Abingdon (Aelfric), monk and Abbot of Abingdon, later Bishop of Wilton and twenty-ninth Archbishop of Canterbury in 995 (1005)

Post-Schism Orthodox saints

 Venerable Sergius, Priest and missionary, of Malopinega, Vologda (1585)

New martyrs and confessors

 New Hieromartyrs Theodore Kolierov, Priest, and with him Martyrs Ananius Boikov and Michael Boldakov (1929)
 New Hieromartyrs Michael Abramov, Protopresbyter, and priests Basil Sokolov, Victor Voronov, John Tsvetkov, Makarius Soloviev and Nicholas Troitsky (1937)
 New Hieromartyr Panteleimon (Arzhanykh), Abbot of Optina Monastery (1937)
 Martyr Demetrius Spiridonov (1938)
 New Hieromartyr Philoumenos (Hasapis) of Jacob's Well (1979) (see also: November 29)

Other commemorations

 Repose of Schemamonk John the Fingerless (1843), disciple of St. Paisius Velichkovsky.

Icon gallery

Notes

References

Sources
 November 16 / December 29. Orthodox Calendar (PRAVOSLAVIE.RU).
 November 29 / November 16. Holy Trinity Russian Orthodox Church (A parish of the Patriarchate of Moscow).
 November 16. OCA - The Lives of the Saints.
 The Autonomous Orthodox Metropolia of Western Europe and the Americas (ROCOR). St. Hilarion Calendar of Saints for the year of our Lord 2004. St. Hilarion Press (Austin, TX). p. 86.
 The Sixteenth Day of the Month of November. Orthodoxy in China.
 November 16. Latin Saints of the Orthodox Patriarchate of Rome.
 The Roman Martyrology. Transl. by the Archbishop of Baltimore. Last Edition, According to the Copy Printed at Rome in 1914. Revised Edition, with the Imprimatur of His Eminence Cardinal Gibbons. Baltimore: John Murphy Company, 1916. p. 353-354.
 Rev. Richard Stanton. A Menology of England and Wales, or, Brief Memorials of the Ancient British and English Saints Arranged According to the Calendar, Together with the Martyrs of the 16th and 17th Centuries. London: Burns & Oates, 1892. pp. 544–550.
Greek Sources
 Great Synaxaristes:  16 ΝΟΕΜΒΡΙΟΥ. ΜΕΓΑΣ ΣΥΝΑΞΑΡΙΣΤΗΣ.
  Συναξαριστής. 16 Νοεμβρίου. ECCLESIA.GR. (H ΕΚΚΛΗΣΙΑ ΤΗΣ ΕΛΛΑΔΟΣ). 
  16/11/2015. Ορθόδοξος Συναξαριστής. 
Russian Sources
  29 ноября (16 ноября). Православная Энциклопедия под редакцией Патриарха Московского и всея Руси Кирилла (электронная версия). (Orthodox Encyclopedia - Pravenc.ru).
  16 ноября по старому стилю / 29 ноября по новому стилю. Русская Православная Церковь - Православный церковный календарь на 2018 год.

November in the Eastern Orthodox calendar